Patía is a colombian municipality located in Cauca department. The administrative centre of Patía is El Bordo.

Within the main touristic attractions of the region we can find Piedra Sentada: The Parador Patía, The Lerma Hill and Patía river that irrigates the valley of the same name. This river is the largest and abundant of the basin of the Sudamerican Pacific.

The Patía is located on Panamerican road, about 82 km at south of Popayán, capital of Cauca department.

History

The populated of Patía Valley, was conformed since prehispanic period by Bojoles Indians, Chapa chugas, Sindaguas y Patias, leaving their vestige to disappear behind the forced work and the missions in the Indians doctrinaire chapels and after of slaves that made part of the social organization of the farm landowners, that nowadays are places of archeologic evidence.

The foundation of the towns  in the Patía Valley was realized by the clergy; When Indian population decimated, came the black spooks (black run off people) and released of the farms and mines that were exploited along the Patía river Guachicono until Juananbu in the Nariño department, creating the towns — or palenques — of black people.

The myths created in this region tell that after they ran off and with the idea of descrying their original Africa, the black spooks climbed the Manzanillo hill and when they did not see their ancestral land, they cried and cried, so much that their tears formed a lake.

Today this foundational mythical place can be visited in the rock of the hill Manzanillo, from which springs permanently feed the riverbed of the Valerio ravine.

Within its task there was the extraction of gold with punts in the depression called The Hoyo, where are located Quilcacé river and Esmita, where nowadays is handmade exploit mines of coal.

Geography

The Patía valley is conformed by the municipalities of The Bordo, Patía, Mercaderes and the townships Galindez, Mojarras and Pilón.

The central section of the Patía River flows through the Patía Valley dry forests ecoregion.
The Patía valley is framed by  the western and central ranges, where flows the Patía river from north to south that extends itself towards the Nariño department.

Located in the south of the Cauca department, the valley and the places that conforme its whole thickness, are located approximately between 4 and 6 hours of the city Popayan. This place is located between the Guachicono, San Jorge and Mama Conde rivers, that converge in the Patía 
river. The Manzanillo hill safekeeps every prairie of the valley.

The first of the municipalities that shapes the Patía valley, is the Patía, whose administrative centre is El Bordo

Physical description: El Bordo, is located at 02° 06' 56" of north latitude and 76° 59' 21"of west length.
Its height on sea level is of 910 meters.

Its middle temperature is: 23 °C.

The municipality area is 732 km².

Its limits are: at north with the municipalities of The Tambo and The Sierra, at east with the municipalities of Bolívar and the Sierra, at south with Sucre and Mercaderes, and by the west with the municipalities of Balboa and Argelia.

Are part of the Patía the townships: Tha Hoyo, The Fonda or Portugal, The Tallas, Mendez, Pan de Azúcar, Angulo, Bello Horizonte, Brisas, Santacruz, Don Alonso, The Estrecho, The Placer, The Puro, Galindez, The Mesa, Piedra Sentada and Santa Rosa Baja.

Has a total expansión of: 755.000 km²

Urban area extension: 22.240 km²

Countrified area extensión: 732.760 km²

Merchants:

Its limits are: At north with the municipalities of Patía and Balboa, at east with the municipality of Bolivar, at west with Nariño department and the municipalities of Leyva and the Rosario, and at the south with the municipality of Florencia and Nariño department, municipalities of Taminango, San Lorenzo and La Unión.

Has a total expansión of: 641.009 km²

Its height on sea level is: : 1.167 metros.
Middle temperature: 22 °C

Directions to get Valley Patia

To get Valley Patia, the travelers go across the municipalities of Timbio and Rosas, going through townships as Piedrasentada and El Mango, until get the municipality of El Bordo, that is where start what is known as Patia Valley. Is continuous the route and approximately in 30 minutes is reached at Patia, totumo's koumis´ and watermelon's land. After de Patía we can find Galindez and Pilón. Farther from these places and following the Panamerican highway is reached the township El estrecho, where there's road to address toward Balboa – Cauca that is recognized popularly as “The Patia Balcony”, or address toward Mojarras, some other place that belongs to the beautiful thickness of Patia Valley. Here in Mojarras, is possible to decide if it is better to continue to the south, through the Nariño department, or to divert to get to Mercaderes – Cauca, the last station of the Valley.

Patia Valley Culture

The culture of the whole region is based specifically in dance, the music and the theater.
Their musical culture is one of the richest in the Cauca and Valle del Patia that became the cradle of Bambuco-  no just classic but Patiano- The Patiano Bambuco, is a kind or better, a music system that plays, sings, dances and acts out. It moves in a rhythm of 6 / 8 in the minor mode, and recently in a major for the innovations of the new composers. Accompanied by string instruments like the violin and the guitars, drums and percussion and cununos. The texts sung slyly express their everyday lives, full of irony and critical to things that affect them. Reflects community events such as weddings, food, love relationships, satire to the government, health problems, personalities, community problems and death. Interpreted by the adult men, women, youth dances and children.
It is also patiano because it is interpreted with native instruments like the violin patiano, charango and created based charrasca totumo fruit that occurs throughout the region and that is the basis of the economy of its inhabitants, Since their work is a collection of the work of "basic foodstuffs" who mostly women to support her family.

References

Municipalities of Cauca Department